Pascual Gutiérrez (29 November 1914 – 26 March 1987) was a Mexican athlete. He competed in the men's long jump at the 1936 Summer Olympics.

References

1914 births
1987 deaths
Athletes (track and field) at the 1936 Summer Olympics
Mexican male long jumpers
Olympic athletes of Mexico
Place of birth missing
Central American and Caribbean Games medalists in athletics